This is a list of individuals and events related to Tajikistan in 2021.

Incumbents

Events

January to February

March to April 
 April 9 - Tajik President Emomali Rahmon visited the Vorukh exclave, assuring residents that there would not be a land exchange with Kyrgyzstan for the territory.
 April 28 - Clashes began in Vorukh following border disputes between Tajikistan and Kyrgyzstan. At least 4 people are killed and hundreds displaced.
 April 29 - Kyrgyzstan and Tajikistan agrees for a ceasefire after a conflict erupts in Vorukh.

May to June

July to August
 12 August - Russia will provide $1.1 million to build a new military outpost near Tajik-Afghan border following deteriorating security condition in Afghanistan.

See also
 Outline of Tajikistan
 Index of Tajikistan-related articles
 List of Tajikistan-related topics
 History of Tajikistan

References

Notes

Citations

Further reading
 
 

 
Tajikistan
Tajikistan
Years of the 21st century in Tajikistan